Bobby Vinton Sings the Big Ones is Vinton's fourth studio album, released in 1962. There were two singles from this album: "Rain Rain Go Away" and "I Love You the Way You Are" (the latter written completely by Vinton). Cover versions include "I'm Getting Sentimental Over You", "Ramblin' Rose", "The Twelfth of Never", "Because of You", "Be My Love", "My Heart Cries for You", "I Remember You", "He'll Have to Go" and "Autumn Leaves".

The song "I Love You The Way You Are" was originally recorded in the late 50s as a demo and left unreleased.  After Vinton had a hit with "Roses are Red (My Love)", Diamond Records purchased the demo and issued it as a single, reaching #38.  They didn't even have another Vinton song to use as the B-side, so they put a song by Chuck and Johnny as the flip.  Diamond refused to lease the single to Epic for the LP, so Epic had Vinton rerecord the song.  The original hit version has never been issued on LP.

Track listing

Personnel
Robert Morgan - producer
Robert Mersey - arranger, conductor

Charts
Album - Billboard (North America)

Singles - Billboard (North America)

References

1962 albums
Bobby Vinton albums
Epic Records albums